David Hencke is a British investigative journalist and writer, named "Political Journalist of the Year" at the 2012 British Press Awards.

Career
Hencke began as a student journalist in 1965 at Warwick University as editor of its first university newspaper, Giblet, while studying history and politics. In 1968 he worked for the Northamptonshire Evening Telegraph, then in 1971 joined the Western Mail in Cardiff and in 1973 the Times Higher Education Supplement.

Hencke joined The Guardian in 1976, becoming the newspaper's Westminster Correspondent in 1986. He has won numerous awards for his political coverage.

In 1994 he was named What the Papers Say Journalist of the Year for his investigation that uncovered the "Cash-for-questions affair". His exposé led to the bankruptcy of Ian Greer Associates, one of the country’s biggest lobbying companies, and the resignations of two junior ministers, Neil Hamilton and Tim Smith.

In 1998, Hencke won "Scoop of the Year" for a story that caused the first resignation of Peter Mandelson, over a secret undeclared £373,000 home loan given to him by fellow Treasury minister, Geoffrey Robinson.

In 2009, Hencke took voluntary redundancy from The Guardian after 33 years. He works as the Westminster correspondent for Tribune and an investigative journalist for the (now closed) Exaro website.

In 2012, Hencke was named "Political Journalist of the Year" at the British Press Awards.

In 2014, Hencke was longlisted for the Orwell Prize for political journalism.

Hencke manages his blog Westminster Confidential on which he publishes "news, views, investigations and much more", and regularly contributes to Byline Times.

Libel

Former MP John Hemming (Liberal Democrats), who had been falsely accused of abuse in an article in the Exaro website by Hencke, succeeded in a libel action against him in January 2019, resulting in Hencke and Graham Wilmer of the Lantern Project paying over £10,000 in compensation for the false allegations. In August 2019, Staffordshire Police confirmed that they were investigating whether Hemming's accuser, Esther Baker, had misled detectives.

Books
 David Hencke (1976) Colleges in Crisis
 David Hencke and Francis Beckett (2004) The Blairs and their court
 David Hencke (2004) Marching to the Fault Line, which examined the 1984 miners' strike.
 David Hencke and Francis Beckett (2005) The Survivor: Tony Blair in peace and war

References

External links
David Hencke’s blog
Story archive on the Guardian
Story archive on Exaro
Articles listed on Journalisted
Exaro, the investigative news website

British male journalists
Living people
The  Guardian journalists
Year of birth missing (living people)